Autosticha imitativa is a moth in the family Autostichidae. It was described by Ueda in 1997. It is found in China (Kiangsu, Jiangxi), Taiwan and Honshu, Japan.

The wingspan is 14–15 mm. The forewings are brownish-ochreous, with relatively small discal stigmata.

References

Moths described in 1997
Autosticha
Moths of Asia